The Kakavaberd dialect is an Armenian dialect spoken in the villages Vahravar, Gudemnis, Kuris and Agarak in Armenia. The inhabitants of the latter village now live in Meghri and it should not be confused with town Agarak.

References
H. D. Muradyan, Kakʿavaberdi mijčyuġayin barbaṙə, HSSR GA Texekagir: hasarakakan gitutyunneri, No. 3, 1961

Armenian dialects